Rhizoecus is a genus of true bugs belonging to the family Pseudococcidae.

The genus has almost cosmopolitan distribution.

Species:
 Rhizoecus advenoides Takagi & Kawai, 1971 
 Rhizoecus albidus Goux, 1942

References

Pseudococcidae
Sternorrhyncha genera